

Events

Pre-1600
539 BC – The army of Cyrus the Great of Persia takes Babylon, ending the Babylonian empire. (Julian calendar)
 633 –  Battle of Hatfield Chase: King Edwin of Northumbria is defeated and killed by an alliance under Penda of Mercia and Cadwallon of Gwynedd.
1279 – The Nichiren Shōshū branch of Buddhism is founded in Japan.
1398 – In the Treaty of Salynas, Lithuania cedes Samogitia to the Teutonic Knights.
1406 – Chen Yanxiang, the only person from Indonesia known to have visited dynastic Korea, reaches Seoul after having set out from Java four months before.
1492 – Christopher Columbus's first expedition makes landfall in the Caribbean, specifically on San Salvador Island. (Julian calendar)

1601–1900
1654 – The Delft Explosion devastates the city in the Netherlands, killing more than 100 people.
1692 – The Salem witch trials are ended by a letter from Province of Massachusetts Bay Governor William Phips.
1748 – War of Jenkins' Ear: A British squadron wins a tactical victory over a Spanish squadron off Havana.
1773 – America's first insane asylum opens.
1792 – The first celebration of Columbus Day is held in New York City.
1793 – The cornerstone of Old East, the oldest state university building in the United States, is laid at the University of North Carolina at Chapel Hill.
1798 – Flemish and Luxembourgish peasants launch the rebellion against French rule known as the Peasants' War.
1799 – Jeanne Geneviève Labrosse becomes the first woman to jump from a balloon with a parachute.
1810 – The citizens of Munich hold the first Oktoberfest in celebration of the marriage of Crown Prince Louis of Bavaria and Princess Therese of Saxe-Hildburghausen.
1822 – Pedro I of Brazil is proclaimed the emperor.
1849 – The city of Manizales, Colombia, is founded by 'The Expedition of the 20'.
1856 – An M 7.7–8.3 earthquake off the Greek island of Crete cause major damage as far as Egypt and Malta.
1871 – The British in India enact the Criminal Tribes Act, naming many local communities "Criminal Tribes".
1890 – Uddevalla Suffrage Association is formed.
1892 – The Pledge of Allegiance is first recited by students in many US public schools.

1901–present
1901 – President Theodore Roosevelt officially renames the "Executive Mansion" to the White House.
1915 – World War I: British nurse Edith Cavell is executed by a German firing squad for helping Allied soldiers escape from occupied Belgium.
1917 – World War I: The First Battle of Passchendaele takes place resulting in the largest single-day loss of life in New Zealand history.
1918 – A massive forest fire kills 453 people in Minnesota.
1928 – An iron lung respirator is used for the first time at Boston Children's Hospital.
1933 – The military Alcatraz Citadel becomes the civilian Alcatraz Federal Penitentiary.
1944 – World War II: The Axis occupation of Athens comes to an end.
1945 – World War II: Desmond Doss is the first conscientious objector to receive the U.S. Medal of Honor.
  1945   – The Lao Issara took control of Laos' government and reaffirmed the country's independence.
1959 – At the national congress of the American Popular Revolutionary Alliance in Peru, a group of leftist radicals are expelled from the party who later form APRA Rebelde.
1960 – Soviet Premier Nikita Khrushchev pounds his shoe on a desk at the United Nations to protest a Philippine assertion.
  1960   – Japan Socialist Party leader Inejiro Asanuma is stabbed to death during a live television broadcast.
1962 – The Columbus Day Storm strikes the U.S. Pacific Northwest with record wind velocities. There was at least U.S. $230 million in damages and 46 people died.
1963 – After nearly 23 years of imprisonment, Reverend Walter Ciszek, a Jesuit missionary, was released from the Soviet Union.
1964 – The Soviet Union launches the Voskhod 1 into Earth orbit as the first spacecraft with a multi-person crew, and the first flight without pressure suits.
1967 – A bomb explodes on board Cyprus Airways Flight 284 while flying over the Mediterranean Sea, killing 66.
1968 – Equatorial Guinea becomes independent from Spain.
1970 – Vietnam War: Vietnamization continues as President Richard Nixon announces that the United States will withdraw 40,000 more troops before Christmas.
1971 – The 2,500 year celebration of the Persian Empire begins. 
1973 – President Nixon nominates House Majority Leader Gerald R. Ford as the successor to Vice President Spiro T. Agnew. 
1977 – Hua Guofeng succeeds Mao Zedong as paramount leader of China.  
1979 – Typhoon Tip becomes the largest and most intense tropical cyclone ever recorded.
1983 – Japan's former Prime Minister Tanaka Kakuei is found guilty of taking a $2 million bribe from the Lockheed Corporation, and is sentenced to four years in jail.
1984 – The Provisional Irish Republican Army fail to assassinate Prime Minister Margaret Thatcher and her cabinet.  The bomb kills five people and wounds 31.
1988 – Two officers of the Victoria Police are gunned down execution-style in the Walsh Street police shootings, Australia.
1992 – A 5.8 earthquake occurred in Cairo, Egypt. At least 510 died.
1994 – The Magellan spacecraft burns up in the atmosphere of Venus.
1996 – New Zealand holds its first general election under the new mixed-member proportional representation system, which led to Jim Bolger's National Party forming a coalition government with Winston Peters's New Zealand First.
1997 – The Sidi Daoud massacre in Algeria kills 43 people at a fake roadblock.
1998 – Matthew Shepard, a gay student at University of Wyoming, dies five days after he was beaten outside of Laramie.
1999 – Pervez Musharraf takes power in Pakistan from Nawaz Sharif through a bloodless coup.
  1999   – The former Autonomous Soviet Republic of Abkhazia declares its independence from Georgia.
2000 – The USS Cole, a US Navy destroyer, is badly damaged by two al-Qaeda suicide bombers, killing 17 crew members and wounding at least 39.
2002 – Terrorists detonate bombs in the Sari Club in Bali, killing 202 and wounding over 300.
2005 – The second Chinese human spaceflight, Shenzhou 6, is launched, carrying two cosmonauts in orbit for five days.
2010 – The Finnish Yle TV2 channel's Ajankohtainen kakkonen current affairs program airs controversial Homoilta episode (literally "gay night"), which leads to the resignation of almost 50,000 Finns from the Evangelical Lutheran Church.
2012 – The European Union wins the 2012 Nobel Peace Prize. 
2013 – Fifty-one people are killed after a truck veers off a cliff in Peru.
2017 – The United States announces its decision to withdraw from UNESCO. Israel immediately follows.
2018 – Princess Eugenie marries Jack Brooksbank at St. George's Chapel, Windsor Castle.
2019 – Typhoon Hagibis makes landfall in Japan, killing 10 and forcing the evacuation of one million people.
  2019   – Eliud Kipchoge from Kenya becomes the first person to run a marathon in less than two hours with a time of 1:59:40 in Vienna.
  2019   – The Hard Rock Hotel in New Orleans, which is under construction, collapses, killing two and injuring 20.

Births

Pre-1600
1008 – Go-Ichijō, emperor of Japan (d. 1036)
1240 – Trần Thánh Tông, emperor of Vietnam (then Đại Việt) (d. 1290)
1350 – Dmitri Donskoi, Grand Duke of Moscow (d. 1389)
1490 – Bernardo Pisano, Italian composer and priest (d. 1548)
1533 – Asakura Yoshikage, Japanese ruler (d. 1573)
1537 – Edward VI, king of England (d. 1553)
1555 – Peregrine Bertie, 13th Baron Willoughby de Eresby, English diplomat (d. 1601)
1558 – Maximilian III, archduke of Austria (d. 1618)
1576 – Thomas Dudley, English-American soldier and politician, 3rd Governor of the Massachusetts Bay Colony (d. 1653)

1601–1900
1602 – William Chillingworth, English scholar and theologian (d. 1644)
1614 – Henry More, English philosopher (d. 1687)
1687 – Sylvius Leopold Weiss, German lute player and composer (d. 1750)
1710 – Jonathan Trumbull, American colonel and politician, 16th Governor of Connecticut (d. 1785)
1725 – Étienne Louis Geoffroy, French pharmacist and entomologist (d. 1810)
1792 – Christian Gmelin, German chemist and pharmacist (d. 1860)
1798 – Pedro I, emperor of Brazil (d. 1834)
1801 – Friedrich Frey-Herosé, Swiss lawyer and politician, 5th President of the Swiss Confederation (d. 1873)
1815 – William J. Hardee, American general (d. 1873)
1838 – George Thorn, Australian politician, 6th Premier of Queensland (d. 1905)
1840 – Helena Modjeska, Polish-American actress (d. 1909)
1855 – Arthur Nikisch, Hungarian conductor and academic (d. 1922)
1860 – Elmer Ambrose Sperry, American engineer and businessman, co-invented the gyrocompass (d. 1930)
1864 – Kamini Roy, British India's first female graduate, Bengali poet, social activist, and feminist writer (d. 1933)
1865 – Arthur Harden, English biochemist and academic, Nobel Prize laureate (d. 1940)
1866 – Ramsay MacDonald, Scottish journalist and politician, Prime Minister of the United Kingdom (d. 1937)
1868 – August Horch, German engineer and businessman, founded Audi (d. 1951)
  1868   – Mariano Trías, Filipino general and politician, 1st Vice President of the Philippines (d. 1914)
1872 – Ralph Vaughan Williams, English composer and educator (d. 1958)
1874 – Jimmy Burke, American baseball player and manager (d. 1942)
1875 – Aleister Crowley, English magician and author (d. 1947)
1878 – Truxtun Hare, American football player and hammer thrower (d. 1956)
1880 – Louis Hémon, French-Canadian author (d. 1913)
  1880   – Kullervo Manner, Finnish Speaker of the Parliament, the Prime Minister of the FSWR and the Supreme Commander of the Red Guards (d. 1939)
1891 – Edith Stein, Polish nun and martyr; later canonized (d. 1942)
  1891   – Fumimaro Konoe, Japanese soldier and politician, 39th Prime Minister of Japan (d. 1945)
1892 – Gilda dalla Rizza, Italian soprano and actress (d. 1975)
1893 – Velvalee Dickinson, American spy (d. 1980)
1894 – Elisabeth of Romania, queen consort of Greece (d. 1956)
1896 – Eugenio Montale, Italian poet and translator, Nobel Prize laureate (d. 1981)

1901–present
1903 – Josephine Hutchinson, American actress (d. 1998)
1904 – Lester Dent, American journalist and author (d. 1959)
  1904   – Ding Ling, Chinese author and educator (d. 1986)
1906 – Joe Cronin, American baseball player and manager (d. 1984)
  1906   – John Murray, American playwright and producer (d. 1984)
  1906   – Piero Taruffi, Italian race car driver and motorcycle racer (d. 1988) 
1908 – Paul Engle, American novelist, poet, playwright, and critic (d. 1991)
  1908   – Ann Petry, American novelist (d. 1997)
1909 – Dorothy Livesay, Canadian poet (d. 1996)
1910 – Robert Fitzgerald, American poet, critic, and translator (d. 1985)
  1910   – Malcolm Renfrew, American chemist and academic (d. 2013)
1911 – Vijay Merchant, Indian cricketer (d. 1987) 
1912 – Muhammad Shamsul Huq, Bangladeshi academic and former Minister of Foreign Affairs (d. 2006)
1913 – Alice Chetwynd Ley, English author and educator (d. 2004)
1914 – John E. Hodge, African-American chemist (d. 1996)
1916 – Alice Childress, American actress and playwright (d. 1994)
  1916   – Lock Martin, American actor (d. 1959)
1917 – Roque Máspoli, Uruguayan footballer and manager (d. 2004)
1919 – Gilles Beaudoin, Canadian politician, 34th Mayor of Trois-Rivières (d. 2007)
  1919   – Doris Miller, American cook and soldier (d. 1943)
1920 – Christopher Soames, English politician and diplomat, Governor of Southern Rhodesia (d. 1987)
1921 – Art Clokey, American animator, producer, screenwriter, and voice actor, created Gumby (d. 2010)
  1921   – Jaroslav Drobný, Czech-English tennis player and ice hockey player (d. 2001)
  1921   – Logie Bruce Lockhart, Scottish rugby player and journalist (d. 2020)
1922 – William H. Sullivan, American soldier and diplomat, United States Ambassador to the Philippines (d. 2013)
1923 – Jean Nidetch, American businesswoman, co-founded Weight Watchers (d. 2015)
  1923   – Goody Petronelli, American boxer, trainer, and manager (d. 2012)
1924 – Leonidas Kyrkos, Greek politician (d. 2011)
1925 – Denis Lazure, Canadian psychiatrist and politician (d. 2008)
1928 – Al Held, American painter and academic (d. 2005)
  1928   – Domna Samiou, Greek singer and musicologist (d. 2012)
1929 – Nappy Brown, American R&B singer-songwriter (d. 2008)
  1929   – Robert Coles, American psychologist, author, and academic
  1929   – Magnus Magnusson, Icelandic journalist and academic (d. 2007)
1930 – Denis Brodeur, Canadian ice hockey player and photographer (d. 2013)
  1930   – Milica Kacin Wohinz, Slovenian historian and author (d. 2021)
1931 – Ole-Johan Dahl, Norwegian computer scientist and academic, co-developed Simula (d. 2002)
1932 – Dick Gregory, American comedian, actor, and author (d. 2017)
  1932   – Ned Jarrett, American race car driver and sportscaster
1933 – Guido Molinari, Canadian painter and art collector (d. 2004)
1934 – James "Sugar Boy" Crawford, American singer-songwriter and pianist (d. 2012)
  1934   – Richard Meier, American architect, designed the Getty Center and City Tower
  1934   – Albert Shiryaev, Russian mathematician and academic
  1934   – Oğuz Atay, Turkish engineer and author (d. 1977)
1935 – Don Howe, English footballer and manager (d. 2015)
  1935   – Tony Kubek, American baseball player and sportscaster
  1935   – Sam Moore, American soul singer-songwriter
  1935   – Shivraj Patil, Indian lawyer and politician, Indian Minister of Defence
  1935   – Luciano Pavarotti, Italian tenor and actor (d. 2007)
1937 – Paul Hawkins, Australian race car driver (d. 1969)
  1937   – Robert Mangold, American painter
1941 – Michael Mansfield, English lawyer, academic, and republican
1942 – Melvin Franklin, American soul bass singer (d. 1995)
1943 – Kostas Tsakonas, Greek actor (d. 2015)
1944 – Angela Rippon, English journalist and author
1945 – Aurore Clément, French actress
1946 – Drew Edmondson, American politician
  1946   – Ashok Mankad, Indian cricketer (d. 2008)
  1946   – Daryl Runswick, English bassist and composer
1947 – Chris Wallace, American journalist
1948 – John Engler, American businessman and politician, 46th Governor of Michigan
  1948   – Rick Parfitt, English singer-songwriter and guitarist (d. 2016)
1949 – Dave Lloyd, English cyclist and coach
  1949   – Carlos the Jackal, Venezuelan convicted of terrorism and murderer
  1949   – Paul Went, English footballer and manager (d. 2017)
1950 – Susan Anton, American actress and model
  1950   – Dave Freudenthal, American economist and politician, 31st Governor of Wyoming
1951 – Sally Little, South African-American golfer
  1951   – Ed Royce, American businessman and politician
  1951   – Norio Suzuki, Japanese golfer
1952 – Trevor Chappell, Australian cricketer and coach
  1952   – Béla Csécsei, Hungarian educator and politician (d. 2012)
  1952   – Roger Heath-Brown, English mathematician and theorist
1953 – Les Dennis, English comedian and actor
  1953   – David Threlfall, English actor and director
1954 – Evalie A. Bradley, Anguillian politician and member of the House of Assembly of Anguilla
  1954   – Massimo Ghini, Italian actor
  1954   – Michael Roe, American singer, songwriter, and record producer
  1954   – Linval Thompson, Jamaican singer and producer
1955 – Einar Jan Aas, Norwegian footballer
  1955   – Pat DiNizio, American singer-songwriter and guitarist (d. 2017)
  1955   – Ante Gotovina, Croatian general
  1955   – Jane Siberry, Canadian singer-songwriter and producer
1956 – Rafael Ábalos, Spanish author 
  1956   – Allan Evans, Scottish footballer
  1956   – Lutz Haueisen, German cyclist
  1956   – Catherine Holmes, Australian judge
  1956   – Gerti Schanderl, German figure skater
  1956   – David Vanian, English singer-songwriter
1957 – Clémentine Célarié, French actress, singer, and director
  1957   – Serge Clerc, French comic book artist and illustrator
  1957   – Mike Dowler, Welsh football goalkeeper
  1957   – Annik Honoré, Belgian journalist and music promoter (d. 2014)
  1957   – William F. Laurance, Australian biologist
1958 – Steve Austria, American lawyer and politician
  1958   – Maria de Fátima Silva de Sequeira Dias, Portuguese historian, author, and academic (d. 2013)
  1958   – Jeff Keith, American rock singer-songwriter
  1958   – Bryn Merrick, Welsh bass player (d. 2015)
1959 – Anna Escobedo Cabral, American lawyer and politician, 42nd Treasurer of the United States
1960 – Steve Lowery, American golfer
  1960   – Carlo Perrone, Italian footballer and manager
  1960   – Dorothee Vieth, German Paralympic cyclist
1961 – Chendo, Spanish footballer
1962 – Carlos Bernard, American actor and director
  1962   – Michelle Botes, South African actress
  1962   – Chris Botti, American trumpet player and composer
  1962   – John Coleman, English footballer and manager
  1962   – Branko Crvenkovski, Macedonian engineer and politician, 3rd President of the Republic of Macedonia
  1962   – Deborah Foreman, American actress and photographer
  1962   – Mads Eriksen, Norwegian guitarist and composer
1963 – Raimond Aumann, German footballer
  1963   – Hideki Fujisawa, Japanese composer
  1963   – Satoshi Kon, Japanese animator and screenwriter (d. 2010)
  1963   – Dave Legeno, English actor and mixed martial artist (d. 2014)
  1963   – Alan McDonald, Irish footballer and manager (d. 2012)
  1963   – Luis Polonia, Dominican baseball player
1965 – Dan Abnett, English author
  1965   – J. J. Daigneault, Canadian ice hockey player and coach
  1965   – Scott O'Grady, American captain and pilot
1966 – Jonathan Crombie, Canadian actor and voice over artist (d. 2015)
  1966   – Wim Jonk, Dutch footballer
  1966   – Brian Kennedy, Northern Irish singer-songwriter and guitarist
  1966   – Brenda Romero, American game designer
1967 – Becky Iverson, American golfer
1968 – Bill Auberlen, American race car driver
  1968   – Paul Harragon, Australian rugby league player and sportscaster
  1968   – Hugh Jackman, Australian actor, singer, and producer
  1968   – Leon Lett, American football player
1969 – Martie Maguire, American singer-songwriter, violinist, and producer 
  1969   – Željko Milinovič, Slovenian footballer
  1969   – Dwayne Roloson, Canadian ice hockey player and coach
  1969   – José Valentín, American baseball player, coach, and manager
1970 – Kirk Cameron, American actor, screenwriter, and Christian evangelical/anti-evolution activist
  1970   – Patrick Musimu, Belgian diver and physiotherapist (d. 2011)
  1970   – Tanyon Sturtze, American baseball player
  1970   – Charlie Ward, American basketball player and coach
1971 – Tony Fiore, American baseball player
  1971   – Steve Johnston, Australian motorcycle racer
  1971   – Bronzell Miller, American football player and actor (d. 2013)
1972 – Neriah Davis, American model and actress
  1972   – Juan Manuel Silva, Argentinian race car driver
  1972   – Tom Van Mol, Belgian footballer
1973 – Lesli Brea, Dominican baseball player
  1973   – Martin Corry, English rugby player
1974 – Stephen Lee, English snooker player
1975 – Susana Félix, Portuguese singer-songwriter, producer, and actress
  1975   – Marion Jones, American basketball player and runner
1976 – Simon Bridges, New Zealand politician
1977 – Cristie Kerr, American golfer
  1977   – Bode Miller, American skier
  1977   – Javier Toyo, Venezuelan footballer
1978 – Stefan Binder, German footballer
  1978   – Baden Cooke, Australian cyclist
1979 – Steven Agnew, Northern Irish politician
  1979   – Steve Borthwick, English rugby player
  1979   – Jordan Pundik, American singer-songwriter and guitarist 
1980 – Ledley King, English footballer
1981 – Tom Guiry, American actor 
  1981   – Brian Kerr, Scottish footballer and manager
  1981   – Giuseppe Lanzone, American rower
  1981   – Conrad Smith, New Zealand rugby player
  1981   – Sun Tiantian, Chinese tennis player
1983 – Alex Brosque, Australian footballer
  1983   – Carlton Cole, English footballer
  1983   – Katie Piper, English philanthropist, broadcaster, and acid violence survivor 
  1983   – Mariko Yamamoto, Japanese cricketer
1985 – Michelle Carter, American shot putter
  1985   – Mike Green, Canadian hockey player
  1985   – Anna Iljuštšenko, Estonian high jumper
1985 – Greig Laidlaw, Scottish rugby player
1986 – Ioannis Maniatis, Greek footballer
  1986   – Sergio Peter, German footballer
  1986   – Tyler Blackburn, American actor
1987 – Marvin Ogunjimi, Belgian footballer
1988 – Sam Whitelock, New Zealand rugby player
  1988   – Calum Scott, British singer
1989 – Anna Ohmiya, Japanese curler
1990 – Henri Lansbury, English footballer
1991 – Nicolao Dumitru, Italian footballer
1992 – Josh Hutcherson, American actor and producer
1994 – Alex Katz, American baseball player
  1994   – Sean Monahan, Canadian ice hockey player
  1994   – Olivia Smoliga, American swimmer
1995 – Jessica Hogg, Welsh artistic gymnast
1996 – James Graham, British singer
1996 – Owen Watkin, Welsh rugby player
1997 – Curtis Scott, Australian rugby league player
2004 – Darci Lynne, American ventriloquist

Deaths

Pre-1600
322 BC – Demosthenes, Athenian statesman, (b. 384 BC)
 638 – Honorius I, pope of the Catholic Church
 642 – John IV, pope of the Catholic Church
 884 – Tsunesada, Japanese prince (b. 825)
 974 – Al-Muti, Abbasid caliph (b. 913/14)
1095 – Leopold II, margrave of Austria (b. 1050)
1152 – Adolf III of Berg, German nobleman (b. 1080)
1176 – William d'Aubigny, 1st Earl of Arundel, English politician (b. 1109)
1320 – Michael IX Palaiologos, Byzantine emperor (b. 1277)
1328 – Clementia of Hungary, queen consort of France and Navarre (b. 1293)
1448 – Zhu Quan, Chinese prince, historian and playwright (b. 1378)
1491 – Fritz Herlen, German painter (b. 1449)
1492 – Piero della Francesca, Italian mathematician and painter (b. 1415)
1565 – Jean Ribault, French-American lieutenant and navigator (b. 1520)
1576 – Maximilian II, Holy Roman Emperor (b. 1527)
1590 – Kanō Eitoku, Japanese painter and educator (b. 1543)
1600 – Luis de Molina, Spanish priest and philosopher (b. 1535)

1601–1900
1601 – Nicholas Brend, English landowner (b. 1560)
1632 – Kutsuki Mototsuna, Japanese commander (b. 1549)
1646 – François de Bassompierre, French general and courtier (b. 1579)
1654 – Carel Fabritius, Dutch painter (b. 1622)
1678 – Edmund Berry Godfrey, English lawyer and judge (b. 1621)
1679 – William Gurnall, English minister, theologian, and author (b. 1617)
1685 – Christoph Ignaz Abele, Austrian lawyer and jurist (b. 1628)
1730 – Frederick IV, king of Denmark and Norway (b. 1671)
1758 – Richard Molesworth, 3rd Viscount Molesworth, Irish field marshal and politician (b. 1680)
1812 – Juan José Castelli, Argentinian lawyer and politician (b. 1764)
1828 – Ioan Nicolidi of Pindus, Aromanian physician and noble (b. 1737)
1845 – Elizabeth Fry, English prison reformer, Quaker and philanthropist (b. 1780)
1858 – Hiroshige, Japanese painter (b. 1797)
1870 – Robert E. Lee, American general (b. 1807)
1875 – Jean-Baptiste Carpeaux, French sculptor and painter (b. 1827)
1896 – Christian Emil Krag-Juel-Vind-Frijs, Danish lawyer and politician, 9th Council President of Denmark (b. 1817)
1898 – Calvin Fairbank, American minister and activist (b. 1816)

1901–present
1914 – Margaret E. Knight, American inventor (b. 1838)
1915 – Edith Cavell, English nurse (b. 1865)
1923 – Bunny Lucas, English cricketer (b. 1857)
1924 – Anatole France, French journalist, novelist, and poet, Nobel Prize laureate (b. 1844)
1926 – Edwin Abbott Abbott, English theologian and author (b. 1838)
1933 – John Lister, English philanthropist and politician (b. 1847)
1940 – Tom Mix, American actor, director, producer, and screenwriter (b. 1880)
1946 – Joseph Stilwell, American general (b. 1883)
1948 – Susan Sutherland Isaacs, English psychologist and psychoanalyst (b. 1885)
1954 – George Welch, American soldier and pilot (b. 1918)
1956 – Lorenzo Perosi, Italian composer and painter (b. 1872)
1957 – Arie de Jong, Indonesian-Dutch linguist and physician (b. 1865)
1958 – Gordon Griffith, American actor, director, and producer (b. 1907)
1960 – Inejiro Asanuma, Japanese lawyer and politician (b. 1898)
1965 – Paul Hermann Müller, Swiss chemist and academic, Nobel Prize laureate (b. 1899)
1967 – Ram Manohar Lohia, Indian activist and politician (b. 1910)
1969 – Sonja Henie, Norwegian figure skater and actress (b. 1912)
  1969   – Serge Poliakoff, Russian-French painter and academic (b. 1906)
  1969   – Julius Saaristo, Finnish javelin thrower and soldier (b. 1891)
1970 – Feodor Stepanovich Rojankovsky, Russian-American illustrator and painter (b. 1891)
  1970   – Mustafa Zaidi, Pakistani poet and academic (b. 1930)
1971 – Dean Acheson, American lawyer and politician, 51st United States Secretary of State (b. 1893)
  1971   – Gene Vincent, American musician (b. 1935)
1972 – Robert Le Vigan, French-Argentinian actor and politician (b. 1900)
1973 – Peter Aufschnaiter, Austrian mountaineer, geographer, and cartographer (b. 1899)
1978 – Nancy Spungen, American figure of the 1970s punk rock scene (b. 1958)
1984 – Anthony Berry, English politician (b. 1925)
1985 – Johnny Olson, American radio host and game show announcer (b. 1910)
  1985   – Ricky Wilson, American singer-songwriter and guitarist (b. 1953)
1987 – Alf Landon, American lieutenant and politician, 26th Governor of Kansas (b. 1887)
  1987   – Fahri Korutürk, Turkish commander and politician, 6th President of Turkey (b. 1903)
1988 – Ruth Manning-Sanders, Welsh-English poet and author (b. 1886)
  1988   – Coby Whitmore, American painter and illustrator (b. 1913)
1989 – Jay Ward, American animator, producer, and screenwriter, founded Jay Ward Productions (b. 1920)
1990 – Rifaat el-Mahgoub, Egyptian politician (b. 1926)
  1990   – Peter Wessel Zapffe, Norwegian physician, mountaineer, and author (b. 1899)
1991 – Sheila Florance, Australian actress (b. 1916)
  1991   – Arkady Strugatsky, Russian author and translator (b. 1925)
  1991   – Regis Toomey, American actor (b. 1898)
1993 – Leon Ames, American actor (b. 1902)
1994 – Gérald Godin, Canadian journalist and politician (b. 1938)
1996 – René Lacoste, French tennis player and fashion designer, co-founded Lacoste (b. 1904)
  1996   – Roger Lapébie, French cyclist (b. 1911)
1997 – John Denver, American singer-songwriter, guitarist, and actor (b. 1943)
1998 – Mario Beaulieu, Canadian lawyer and politician (b. 1930)
  1998   – Matthew Shepard, American murder victim (b. 1976)
1999 – Wilt Chamberlain, American basketball player and coach (b. 1936)
  1999   – Robert Marsden Hope, Australian lawyer and judge (b. 1919)
2001 – Quintin Hogg, Baron Hailsham of St Marylebone, English academic and politician, Lord High Chancellor of Great Britain (b. 1907)
  2001   – Hikmet Şimşek, Turkish conductor (b. 1924)
  2001   – Richard Buckle, Ballet critic and writer (b. 1916)
2002 – Ray Conniff, American bandleader and composer (b. 1916)
  2002   – Audrey Mestre, French biologist and diver (b. 1974)
2003 – Jim Cairns, Australian economist and politician, 4th Deputy Prime Minister of Australia (b. 1914)
  2003   – Joan Kroc, American philanthropist (b. 1928)
  2003   – Bill Shoemaker, American jockey (b. 1931)
2005 – C. Delores Tucker, American activist and politician (b. 1927)
2006 – Angelika Machinek, German glider pilot (b. 1956)
  2006.  – Eugène Martin, French race car driver (b. 1915)
  2006   – Gillo Pontecorvo, Italian director and screenwriter (b. 1919)
2007 – Kisho Kurokawa, Japanese architect, designed the Nakagin Capsule Tower (b. 1934)
2008 – Karl Chircop, Maltese physician and politician (b. 1965)
2009 – Dickie Peterson American singer-songwriter and bass player (b. 1948)
  2009   – Frank Vandenbroucke, Belgian cyclist (b. 1974)
2010 – Austin Ardill, Northern Irish soldier and politician (b. 1917)
  2010   – Woody Peoples, American football player (b. 1943)
  2010   – Belva Plain, American author (b. 1919)
2011 – Patricia Breslin, American actress (b. 1931)
  2011   – Dennis Ritchie, American computer scientist, created the C programming language (b. 1941)
2012 – James Coyne, Canadian lawyer and banker, 2nd Governor of the Bank of Canada (b. 1910)
  2012   – Norm Grabowski, American hot rod builder and actor (b. 1933)
  2012   – Sukhdev Singh Kang, Indian judge and politician, 14th Governor of Kerala (b. 1931)
  2012   – Torkom Manoogian, Iraqi-Armenian patriarch (b. 1919)
  2012   – Erik Moseholm, Danish bassist, composer, and bandleader (b. 1930)
  2012   – Břetislav Pojar, Czech animator, director, and screenwriter (b. 1923)
2013 – George Herbig, American astronomer and academic (b. 1920)
  2013   – Oscar Hijuelos, American author and academic (b. 1951)
  2013   – Hans Wilhelm Longva, Norwegian diplomat (b. 1942)
  2013   – Malcolm Renfrew, American chemist and academic (b. 1910)
2014 – Ali Mazrui, Kenyan-American political scientist, philosopher, and academic (b. 1933)
  2014   – Graham Miles, English snooker player (b. 1941)
  2014   – Roberto Telch, Argentinian footballer and coach (b. 1943)
2015 – Abdallah Kigoda, Tanzanian politician, 8th Tanzanian Minister of Industry and Trade (b. 1953)
  2015   – Joan Leslie, American actress, dancer, and vaudevillian (b. 1925)
2017 – Margarita D'Amico, Venezuelan journalist (b. 1938)
2020 – Conchata Ferrell, American actress (b. 1943)
  2020   – Roberta McCain, American socialite and oil heiress (b. 1912)

Holidays and observances
 Christian feast day:
Blessed Louis Brisson
Edith Cavell and Elizabeth Fry (Church of England)
Fiacc
Our Lady of the Pillar (Fiestas del Pilar)
Our Lady of Aparecida
Radim Gaudentius (Czech Republic)
Seraphin of Montegranaro
Wilfrid of Ripon
Carlo Acutis
October 12 (Eastern Orthodox liturgics)
Children's Day (Brazil)
 Discovery of America by Columbus-related observances (see also October 8):
Columbus Day (Honduras)
Día de la Hispanidad or Fiesta Nacional de España, also Armed Forces Day (Spain)
Día de la Raza (El Salvador, Uruguay)
Día de la Resistencia Indígena, "Day of Indigenous Resistance" (Venezuela)
Día de las Américas (Belize)
Día de las Culturas, "Day of the Cultures" (Costa Rica)
Día del Respeto a la Diversidad Cultural, "Day of respect for cultural diversity" (Argentina)
Discovery Day (The Bahamas, Colombia)
Feast for Life of Aleister Crowley, celebrated as "Crowleymas" (Thelema)
Fiesta Nacional de España (Spain)
Freethought Day
Independence Day (Equatorial Guinea), celebrates the independence of Equatorial Guinea from Spain in 1968.
International Day Against DRM

References

External links

 
 
 

Days of the year
October